Indian Stream may refer to:

 Indian Stream, a stream in New Hampshire, a tributary of the Connecticut River 
 Republic of Indian Stream (1832–1835), an unrecognized country existing in disputed territory between Canada and the United States, now part of New Hampshire
 Indian Stream Schoolhouse, Pittsburg, New Hampshire, USA; an NRHP-listed building

See also

 
 
 Indian (disambiguation)
 Stream (disambiguation)
 Indian Brook (disambiguation)
 Indian Creek (disambiguation)
 Indian River (disambiguation)
 Indian Run (disambiguation)